Sadat-e Nejat or Sadat Nejat may refer to:
Al Sadat-e Nejat
Sadat-e Nejat Bozorg
Sadat-e Nejat Kuchak
Sadat Nejat, Ahvaz